The 2013 Tour de France was the 100th Tour de France. It ran from 29 June 2013 to 21 July 2013, starting in the city of Porto-Vecchio in Corsica.

Stage 12

11 July 2013 — Fougères to Tours,

Stage 13
12 July 2013 — Tours to Saint-Amand-Montrond, 

The 13th stage saw a big change in the general classification due to crosswinds leading to the formation of echelons. A 15-man group led by Alberto Contador's Team Saxo Bank, with the help of eventual stage winner Mark Cavendish's Omega Pharma–Quick-Step and Bauke Mollema's Belkin Pro Cycling used the crosswinds to make a gap with other General Classification riders 31 kilometers from the finish to form the echelons. Then again This helped Contador gain 1'09" on – among others – Chris Froome, Nairo Quintana and Joaquim Rodríguez. The biggest victim however was the number 2 in the General Classification at that point: Alejandro Valverde. He lost 9'54" after having a puncture at a critical point in the race. The stage saw escapees Bauke Mollema move to second, Alberto Contador to third, Roman Kreuziger to fourth, Laurens ten Dam to fifth and Jakob Fuglsang to sixth in the General Classification. Chris Froome retained the yellow jersey, while Alejandro Valverde dropped to 16th.

Stage 14

13 July 2013 — Saint-Pourçain-sur-Sioule to Lyon,

Stage 15
14 July 2013 — Givors to Mont Ventoux,

Stage 16
16 July 2013 — Vaison-la-Romaine to Gap,

Stage 17
17 July 2013 — Embrun to Chorges, individual time trial (ITT)

Stage 18
18 July 2013 — Gap to Alpe d'Huez, 

The queen stage of the 2013 Tour de France saw the riders contest six categorised climbs on the day: the Col de Manse, the Rampe du Motty, the Col d'Ormon, the first ascent of the Alpe d'Huez, the Col de Sarenne, and finally a second ascent up Alpe d'Huez.

The day began with a breakaway of nine riders at around the  mark and consisted of the following riders: Jens Voigt, Arnold Jeannesson, Christophe Riblon, Andrey Amador, Sylvain Chavanel, Lars Boom, Tom Danielson, Tejay van Garderen, and Moreno Moser. By the  mark, they had extended their advantage over the peloton to 5' 40". Despite multiple mishaps – van Garderen's chain fell on the descent of the Sarenne and Riblon went off the road – the three leaders were firmly in the lead at the base of the second climb of Alpe d'Huez. Once again, van Garderen attacked at the base of the climb and quickly distanced himself from his leading companions.

Back in the peloton, major changes were occurring in the general classification.  riders Bauke Mollema and Laurens ten Dam both cracked at the beginning of the climb and slid a couple of places on the leaderboard. Nairo Quintana attacked the group and was followed closely by 's Chris Froome and Richie Porte as well as 's Joaquim Rodríguez. The  trio of Alberto Contador, Roman Kreuziger, and Michael Rogers were unable to follow and would lose significant amounts of time. With  to go, Froome and Porte would lose contact with Quintana and Rodríguez; at which point Porte dropped back to the team car to illegally get energy gels for his leader, then paced him to the end of the climb to limit his losses to Quintana and Rodríguez. Porte and Froome each received a 20-second time penalty and a fine of 200 Swiss francs for the infringement.

Stage 19

19 July 2013 — Le Bourg-d'Oisans to Le Grand-Bornand,

Stage 20

20 July 2013 — Annecy to Mont Semnoz,

Stage 21
21 July 2013 — Versailles to Paris,

References

External links

2013 Tour de France
Tour de France stages